Yaguarasaurus is an extinct genus of mosasauroid from the Late Cretaceous (Turonian) period of Colombia, South America. The remains discovered (an articulated skull, some vertebrae and ribs) were defined as a new genus and species of mosasaurid, Yaguarasaurus columbianus, by the Colombian paleontologist María Páramo, former director of the Museo de Geología José Royo y Gómez of INGEOMINAS in Bogotá.

This reptile is a member of the family of marine lizards Mosasauridae characteristic of Middle and Upper Cretaceous, with global distribution, but in South America known only through isolated remains (Price, 1957, Pierce and Welles, 1959 ; Bonaparte, 1978; Ameghino, 1918). This mosasaur discovered in Yaguará, was at the moment of discovery the most complete material known in South America.

Etymology 
The remains were found in a limestone bed (Upper Turonian) of the La Frontera Formation, member of the Villeta Group, near Yaguará, Huila, in a site called Cueva Rica. Its name means "Yaguará lizard of Colombia".

Phylogeny 
In the initial descriptions of Yaguarasaurus, it was classified as a member of the subfamily Plioplatecarpinae; the analysis of Polcyn and Bell (2005) showed that it was a distant relative of the advanced mosasaurids and were a close relative of Russellosaurus coheni and Tethysaurus nopscai, a group that could be a basal clade to the division between Tylosaurinae and Plioplatecarpinae subfamilies, called Russellosaurina. After the discovery of the basal mosasauroid of Hungary Pannoniasaurus by Makádi et al. 2012 it became clear that Yaguarasaurus and the rest of the "russellosaurines" form a clade of basal amphibian mosasaurs related with the aigialosaurs, a grouping called the subfamily Tethysaurinae; the cladogram below follow the analysis of Makádi et al. de 2012:

Palci et al. (2013) describe a new Russellosaurine, Romeosaurus, and created subfamily Yaguarasaurinae, sister group of Tethysaurinae

See also 

 List of mosasaurs

References

External links 
  Yaguarasaurus columbianus - Paleontología en Colombia

Russellosaurins
Turonian life
Mosasaurs of South America
Late Cretaceous reptiles of South America
Cretaceous Colombia
Fossils of Colombia
Fossil taxa described in 1994
Taxa named by María Páramo